Gennady Victorovich Lebedev (1957 in the USSR – May 12, 2004 in Turkey) was a Russian economist, representative of Austrian School, businessman and politician. He advocated free enterprise and laissez-faire.

Biography 
Gennady Lebedev was born in 1957 in Soviet Union. In 1974 he enrolled in MSU Faculty of Mechanics and Mathematics, a faculty of Moscow State University. He graduated with distinction and became postgraduate student. He then joined the Laboratory of computational approaches of MSU Faculty of Mechanics and Mathematics.

He was an author of several computer sciences textbooks. For example, his most popular textbook for pupils, Basic computer sciences and computer engineering, was published in an edition of 7 million. Others of his textbooks are also popular among professors and Lebedev's influence on Russian computer science is widely acknowledged.

In the beginning of 1992 he left the post of chairman and participated in the corporatization of Nakhodka Commercial Sea Port and organisation of Yukos Oil Company where initially he worked as a consultant and later as a vice-president.

Lebedev died on May 12, 2004, and is buried in Troitsk.

Readings in memory of Gennady Lebedev 
Readings in memory of Lebedev take place yearly and are dedicated to projects which develop ideas of freedom and liberty.

Works 
 Liberal Charter. 1992 year 
 Constitution of Ideal State. 1992 year. 
 Commercial Engineering and Municipal Services. 1992 year. 
 Thesises about taxes and tax system. 1997 year. 
 Constitutional amendments. 2001 year. 
 Conception of energetics development in Russian Federation. 2001 year. 
 Obligations of presidential candidate. 1999 year.

GVL Library 
Russian publishing house 'Sotsium'  jointly with 'Liberal Charter' organised the special series of books called 'GVL Library in honour of Gennady Lebedev (GVL are his initials) and the common subject of the books is libertarian orientation.

References

External links 
 Reading in Memory of Gennady Lebedev 
 Gennday Lebedev's page
 GVL Library

1957 births
2004 deaths
Austrian School economists
Moscow State University alumni
Russian economists
Russian libertarians
Russian politicians